Haidarzadeh’s house is a historical mansion situated in Maghsoudieh suburb of Tabriz, Iran, on the south side of Tabriz Municipality building. There is no document showing the date of construction of this historical house, but studies revealed that the house was constructed about 1870 by Haji Habib Lak. The house was registered in the list of National Remains of the Country in 1999 under the number 2524. It covers an area of 900 square meters and has two floors. The house has two interior and exterior yards which are separated by the house.

In the basement, there is a Howz-Khaneh (a large room with a small pool with a fountain in the middle) ornamented with colorful bricks and a vault. Other parts of the house are connected together through a hall. The building was ornamented with wooden-worked windows (called Orosey), stuccoes, colorful glasses, brickworks and paintings. The main room (Shah neshin) is one of the most attractive rooms of the house.

Haidarzadeh house was restored in 2001 and is currently used as Tourism Information Center of East Azerbaijan province and Tabriz.

There are a few historical houses next to the Haidar Zadeh’s house such as Salmasi, Behnam House, Ganja-i Zadeh and Ghadaki House.

Location 
The Haidarzadeh house is located in Maghsoudieh suburb of Tabriz on the south side of Tabriz Municipality building.

Gallery

See also 
 Amir Nezam House
 Behnam House
 House of Seghat ol Islam
 Constitutional Revolution House of Tabriz

References 
 http://www.eachto.ir

External links 
 Virtual Museum of Historical Buildings of Tabriz (School of Architecture, Tabriz Islamic Art University ).
 Tabriz Islamic Art University (دانشگاه هنر اسلامی تبریز), Tabriz, Iran (in Persian). 
 Iranian Student's Tourism & Traveling Agency, ISTTA. (English), (Persian)

Buildings and structures in Tabriz